The Tom Watkins House is a historic house at Oak and Race Streets in Searcy, Arkansas.  It is a two-story brick structure, with a cross-gabled tile roof and a concrete foundation.  A porch extends across part of the front and beyond the left side, forming a carport.  The main roof and porch roof both feature exposed rafter tails in the Craftsman style, and there are small triangular brackets in the gable ends.  The house, a fine local example of Craftsman architecture, was built about 1920 to a design by Charles L. Thompson.

The house was listed on the National Register of Historic Places in 1991.

See also
National Register of Historic Places listings in White County, Arkansas

References

Houses on the National Register of Historic Places in Arkansas
Houses completed in 1920
Houses in Searcy, Arkansas
National Register of Historic Places in Searcy, Arkansas
1920 establishments in Arkansas
American Craftsman architecture in Arkansas
Bungalow architecture in Arkansas